Unobtainium is a term used in fiction, engineering, and common situations for a material ideal for a particular application but impractically hard to get. Unobtainium originally referred to materials that do not exist at all, but can also be used to describe real materials that are unavailable due to extreme rarity or cost. Less commonly, it can mean a device with desirable engineering properties for an application that are exceedingly difficult or impossible to achieve.

The properties of any particular example of unobtainium depend on the intended use. For example, a pulley made of unobtainium might be massless and frictionless. But for a nuclear rocket, unobtainium might have the needed qualities of lightness, strength at high temperatures, and resistance to radiation damage: A combination of all three qualities is impossible with today's materials. The concept of unobtainium is often applied hand-wavingly, flippantly, or humorously.

The word "unobtainium" derives humorously from "unobtainable", with -ium, a suffix for chemical element names. It predates the similar-sounding systematic element names, such as ununennium. An alternate spelling, unobtanium, is sometimes used, perhaps based on the spelling of real elements like titanium and uranium.

Engineering origin 
Since the late 1950s, aerospace engineers have used the term "unobtainium" when referring to unusual or costly materials, or when theoretically considering a material perfect for their needs in all respects, except that it does not exist. 

By the 1990s, the term was in wide use, even in formal engineering papers such as "Towards unobtainium [new composite materials for space applications]."

The word "unobtainium" may well have been coined in the aerospace industry to refer to materials capable of withstanding the extreme temperatures expected in re-entry. Aerospace engineers are frequently tempted to design aircraft which require parts with strength or resilience beyond that of currently available materials.

Later, 'unobtainium' became an engineering term for practical materials that really exist, but are difficult to get. For example, during the development of the SR-71 Blackbird spy plane, Lockheed engineers at the "Skunk Works" under Clarence "Kelly" Johnson used 'unobtainium' as a dysphemism for titanium. Titanium allowed a higher strength-to-weight ratio at the high temperatures the Blackbird would reach, but its availability was restricted because the Soviet Union controlled its supply.  This created a problem for the U.S. during the Cold War because the Blackbird required huge amounts of titanium (and subsequent U.S. military aircraft such as the F-15, F-18, and F-22 fighters and the B-1 bomber required relatively large amounts of it as well).

Contemporary popularization 
By 2010, the term had had been used in mainstream news reports to describe the commercially useful rare earth elements (particularly terbium, erbium, dysprosium, yttrium, and neodymium), which are essential to the performance of consumer electronics and green technology, but whose projected demand far outstrips their current supply.

'Unobtainium' has come to be used among people who are neither science fiction fans nor engineers to denote an object that actually exists, but which is very hard to obtain either because of high price (sometimes referred to as "unaffordium") or limited availability. It usually refers to a very high-end and desirable product. Examples are rear cassettes in the mountain biking community, parts that are no longer available for old-car enthusiasts, parts for reel-to-reel audio-tape recorders, and rare vacuum tubes such as the 1L6 or WD-11 that can now cost more than the equipment in which they were fitted.

There have been repeated attempts to attribute the name to a real material. Space elevator research has long used "unobtainium" to describe a material with the necessary characteristics, but carbon nanotubes might have these characteristics. The eyewear and fashion wear company Oakley, Inc. also frequently denotes the material used for many of their eyeglass nosepieces and earpieces, which has the unusual property of increasing tackiness and thus grip when wet, as unobtanium.

Science fiction

Unobtainium was mentioned briefly in David Brin's 1983 book Startide Rising,  and plays a role in the 2003 film The Core and the 2009 film Avatar.

Similar terms 
The term handwavium (suggesting handwaving) is another term for this hypothetical material, as are  raritanium, and hardtofindium.

The term  (also spelled with variants such as illudium) has been used to describe a material which has "eluded" attempts to develop it. This was mentioned in several Looney Tunes cartoons, where Marvin the Martian tried (unsuccessfully) to use his "Eludium Q-36 Explosive Space Modulator" to blow up the Earth.

Another largely synonymous term is wishalloy, although the sense is often subtly different in that a wishalloy usually does not exist at all, whereas unobtainium may merely be unavailable.

A similar conceptual material in alchemy is the philosopher's stone, a mythical substance with the ability to turn lead into gold, or bestow immortality and youth. While the search to find such a substance was not successful, it did lead to discovery of a new element: phosphorus.

See also
 List of fictional elements, materials, isotopes and subatomic particles
 Materials science in science fiction
 Dysprosium, a real element whose name means "hard to get"

References

External links

 World Wide Words — Unobtanium
 TV Tropes - Unobtainium

Fictional materials
Placeholder names
Avatar (franchise)

hu:Unobtainium#Unobtanium az Avatarban